Bemnifosbuvir (AT-527, RO7496998) is an antiviral drug invented by Atea Pharmaceuticals and licensed to Roche for clinical development, a novel nucleotide analog prodrug originally developed for the treatment of hepatitis C. AT-527 is the orally bioavailable hemisulfate salt of AT-511, which is metabolised in several steps to the active nucleotide triphosphate AT-9010, acting as an RNA polymerase inhibitor and thereby interfering with viral replication. AT-527 has been researched for the treatment of coronavirus diseases such as that produced by SARS-CoV-2.  It showed good results in early clinical trials but had inconsistent results at later stages, so the planned Phase 3 trials are being redesigned and results are not expected until late 2022.

See also
 Galidesivir
 Remdesivir
 Lufotrelvir
 Molnupiravir
 Sofosbuvir

References

Anti–RNA virus drugs
Nucleotides
Experimental drugs
Nitrogen heterocycles